Mohammad Ranjbar (‎; 1 January 1935 – 29 June 2004) was an Iranian footballer and coach. Ranjbar played for Taj Tehran and Pas Tehran. He was a member and captain of Iran national football team. He was also head coach of national team in 1972.

Early years
He was born on 1 January 1935 in Kermanshah, Iran and lives in Kermanshah until end of his high school career. He was joined to the Shahin Kermanshah in 1950. After end of his studying and was moved to Tehran and graduated from Daneshkadeh Afsari.

Club career
He was joined to the Taj club in 1956 but was left the club and moved to the PAS Tehran in 1964. He was captain of PAS from 1965 to 1970 when he retired from playing football.

International career
He was a member of Iran national military team. In 1959 at the age of 25, Ranjbar was invited to the senior team and was a part of the team in the 1960 AFC Asian Cup. After Parviz Dehdari's retirement in 1965, he was captain of the national team for two years. He was retired in 1967 after match against Turkey.

Coaching career
After his retirement from playing football, he began his coaching career as manager of Iran national under-20 football team in 1968. He was selected as assistant coach of the national football team in 1970 and was again selected as this position in 1971 by Parviz Dehdari. After Dehdari's resignation in 1972, Ranjbar was appointed as caretaker manager of the national team which he led to the final victory in 1972 AFC Asian Cup. After team's success with Ranjbar, Iran Football Federation appointed Ranjbar as team's head coach and signed a two years contract with him but he was resigned after two months. He was out of football from 1972 to 1985. In 1985, he was appointed as technical manager of Esteghlal. Ranjbar was team manager of the national team in from 1998 to 2002.

Illness and death
On 12 January 2004, 69-year-old Ranjbar suffering from his fatal disease for several months was dispatched to Hanover, Germany to undergo a surgery but the German doctors preferred not to operate due to his critical conditions. He died on 29 June 2004 and succumbed to his cerebral disorder in Iranmehr hospital, north of Tehran.

Honours

Player
Taj Tehran
 Tehran Province League: 1956–1957, 1957–1958, 1959–1960, 1960–61, 1962–63
 Tehran Hazfi Cup: 1958–1959

Pas Tehran
 Tehran Province League: 1966–67

Iran
 RCD Cup: 1965
 Asian Games silver medal: 1966

Manager
Iran
 AFC Asian Cup: 1972

References

1935 births
2004 deaths
Iranian footballers
Iran international footballers
Iranian football managers
Esteghlal F.C. players
Asian Games silver medalists for Iran
AFC Asian Cup-winning managers
Asian Games medalists in football
Footballers at the 1966 Asian Games
1972 AFC Asian Cup managers
Sportspeople from Kermanshah
Association football defenders
Medalists at the 1966 Asian Games